Nathan Uiliam Fogaça (born 9 June 1999), is a Brazilian professional footballer who plays as a forward for Portland Timbers.

Career
Nathan came through the youth ranks at Coritiba and was called up to the senior side from the under-19s in May 2018. He made his professional debut a month later on 5 June 2018, coming on as a second-half substitute in the 1–0 2018 Campeonato Brasileiro Série B win against CRB. On 24 July 2018 he scored his first professional goal; the winner in the Série B match against Goiás. In April 2021, Fogaça joined American side San Antonio FC on loan for the 2021 season.

In April 2022, Fogaça was signed to a two-year contract by Portland Timbers 2. A month later, he signed with the club's first team who compete in Major League Soccer.

References

External links

1999 births
Living people
Brazilian footballers
Association football forwards
Coritiba Foot Ball Club players
Campeonato Brasileiro Série B players
San Antonio FC players
Brazilian expatriate sportspeople in the United States
Expatriate soccer players in the United States
Brazilian expatriate footballers
MLS Next Pro players
Portland Timbers 2 players
Portland Timbers players
USL Championship players
Major League Soccer players